The 2000–01 Liga Artzit season saw Hapoel Ra'anana win the title and promotion to Liga Leumit alongside runners-up Maccabi Kafr Kanna. Maccabi Ashkelon and Maccabi Sha'arayim were relegated to Liga Alef.

Final table

References
Israel Third Level 2000/01 RSSSF

Liga Artzit seasons
3
Israel